Conchita Martínez was the defending champion but lost in the semifinals to Sabine Hack.

Hack won in the final 7–5, 6–4 against Mary Pierce.

Seeds
A champion seed is indicated in bold text while text in italics indicates the round in which that seed was eliminated. The top four seeds received a bye to the second round.

  Conchita Martínez (semifinals)
  Martina Navratilova (second round)
  Magdalena Maleeva (second round)
  Mary Pierce (final)
  Lindsay Davenport (second round)
  Zina Garrison-Jackson (first round)
  Sabine Hack (champion)
  Barbara Rittner (first round)

Draw

Final

Section 1

Section 2

External links
 ITF tournament edition details
 Tournament draws

Virginia Slims of Houston
1994 WTA Tour